Officials for the 2011 Cricket World Cup were selected by the Umpire Selection Panel and the information was released on 12 December 2010. The panel selected 18 umpires and a reserve umpire, Enamul Haque to officiate at the World Cup: five were from Australia, six from Asia, three from England, two from New Zealand and one each from South Africa and West Indies. It also selected five match referees for the event.

The panel consisted of David Richardson (ICC general manager - cricket), Ranjan Madugalle (ICC chief match referee), David Lloyd (former player, coach, umpire and then television commentator) and Srinivas Venkataraghavan (former elite panel umpire).

Umpires
Out of the selected umpires, 12 belonged to the Elite Panel of ICC Umpires while the remaining six belong to the International Panel of Umpires and Referees. In addition, a reserve umpire Enamul Haque from Bangladesh was selected officiated in the warmup matches and if required, during the event.

The members of the Elite Panel of ICC umpires are generally thought to be the best umpires in the world and hence officiate in almost all senior cricket tournaments and ICC events. The remaining six were identified as emerging and talented match officials, who had already officiated at international level with the experience of conditions in the Asian sub-continent and were thought to be ready to umpire in the World Cup.

Aleem Dar and Simon Taufel were elected to the final, second and first final respectively.

Referees
Five referees were also selected by the selection panel. They belonged to the Elite Panel of ICC Referees and were considered the best cricket referees in the world. Jeff Crowe was the referee in the final.

References

External links
Match officials announced by the ICC. ICC website.

Officials
Cricket World Cup officials